Governor Stevenson may refer to:

Adlai Stevenson II (1900–1965), 31st Governor of Illinois
Charles C. Stevenson (1826–1890), 5th Governor of Nevada
Coke R. Stevenson (1888–1975), 35th Governor of Texas
Edward A. Stevenson (1831–1895), 11th Governor of Idaho Territory
James Stevenson (East India Company officer) (died 1805), temporary district governor of Mysore in 1800
John W. Stevenson (1812–1886), 25th Governor of Kentucky
Malcolm Stevenson (1878–1927), Governor of Cyprus from 1925 to 1926 and Governor of the Seychelles in 1927
William Stevenson (colonial administrator) (1805–1863), 9th Governor of British Mauritius 
William E. Stevenson (1820–1883), 3rd Governor of West Virginia